Angelo Colocci (1467 at Iesi, Marche – 1549) of Rome, papal secretary of Pope Leo X, romance philologist and a Renaissance humanist at the collegial center of literary and artistic classicism, assembled a collection of antiquities in his villa beside the Aqua Virgo.

Biography 
Colocci came to Rome in 1497 as a young man. From 1511 he worked as one of the apostolic secretaries, a demanding position that curtailed his private literary abilities at the same time it placed him in the social center of the humanists at the court of Pope Julius II, as a correspondent of Jacopo Sadoleto, Pietro Bembo and Aldus Manutius in Venice. In 1513 he bought a garden property near the Trevi Fountain, which, with the additional draw of his fine library, became a meeting place of the struggling Roman Academy that had been founded by the late Pomponio Leto (died 1497). This garden was sited in the hollow between the Quirinal and the Pincio, in the southern reaches of the ancient Gardens of Sallust, a rich field of buried sculpture, some of which he displayed in his villa.  There the grotto that he arranged round a Roman marble sleeping naiad, with a humanist inscription— Huius nympha loci...— that was so exquisitely turned it passed for centuries as authentically Roman, was the original of garden features to be found in the great English landscape garden at Stourhead and into the nineteenth century.

Colocci was a Latin poet of some reputation among his learned contemporaries, an antiquarian whose understanding of ancient metrology and sacrificial implements were particularly outstanding, and a savant collector of Roman sculptures, inscriptions, medals and carved gems. His collection of sculptures was mentioned by Andrea Fulvio in Antiquitates Urbis (1527), a topographical guide to the city's ancient Roman ruins and remains. In connection with Pope Leo X's commission to Raphael to draw the most accurate possible reconstruction of the Rome of the Caesars, Angelo Colocci and Baldassare Castiglione drafted the courtly covering letter, with emendations by Raphael, that was enclosed with the final project. A proportion of his considerable fortune was also expended in amassing one of the most impressive private libraries of his time, brutally treated at the Sack of Rome, in 1527, when Colucci was forced to pay exorbitant bribes to preserve his own life. Colocci had the foresight to send some of his manuscripts for safekeeping in Florence. The remaining Colocci manuscripts in the Vatican Library still number over two hundred, even after Napoleonic depredations removed Provençal lyrics to the Bibliothèque nationale, Paris— for Colocci was one of the first to search out and assemble Provençal poetry. The Greek printing press of Rome was under his care, for he was the patron of the Greek academy founded in Rome by Janus Lascaris; it  met in his villa from 1516 to 1521.  Colocci was involved in the translation of Vitruvius' De architectura into Italian on Raphael's behest, done by the venerable Marco Fabio Calvo of Ravenna and based on the 1511 edition of Fra Giocondo; Raphael's own copy of it, preserved in Munich, bears Colocci's notes and emendations as well as Raphael's own.

After the death of his wife Girolama Bufalini Colocci, after a long illness, in 1518, Colocci took minor orders and was made Bishop of Nocera in 1537.

A conference on Angelo Colocci in the Palazzo della Signoria of his birthplace, Iesi in September 1969, resulted in V. Fanelli, ed., Atti del convegno di studi su Angelo Colocci (Jesi, 13-14 settembre 1969), (Città di Castello), 1972, and later in Fanelli's Ricerche su Angelo Colocci e sulla Roma cinquecentesca (Vatican City) 1979.

Notes 

1467 births
1549 deaths
Italian Renaissance humanists